Biswa Bandhu Sen is an Indian Politician and the current deputy speaker of the Tripura Legislative Assembly. He won three consecutive times representing the 56-Dharmanagar constituency of North Tripura district. Prior to 2018 Tripura Legislative Assembly election Sen won twice on INC ticket. On 2017 Sen joined Bharatiya Janata Party & won the 2018 Assembly elections by a margin of 7287 votes.

References

People from North Tripura district
Living people
Year of birth missing (living people)
Tripura politicians
Bharatiya Janata Party politicians from Tripura
Tripura MLAs 2018–2023